Olea oleaster, the wild-olive, has been considered by various botanists a valid species and a subspecies of the cultivated olive tree, Olea europea, which is a tree of multiple origins that was domesticated, it now appears, at various places during the fourth and third millennia BCE, in selections drawn from varying local populations. The wild-olive (Ancient Greek κότινος/kótinos), which ancient Greeks distinguished from the cultivated olive tree (Ancient Greek ἐλαία/ἐλἀα), was used to fashion the olive wreath awarded victors at the ancient Olympic games. The ancient and sacred wild-olive tree of Olympia stood near the Temple of Zeus, patron of the games.

Today, as a result of natural hybridization and the very ancient domestication and extensive cultivation of the olive throughout the Mediterranean Basin, wild-looking feral forms of olive, called "oleasters", constitute a complex of populations, potentially ranging from feral forms to the wild-olive. The wild-olive is a tree of the maquis shrubland, itself in part the result of the long presence of mankind.

The drought-tolerant sclerophyllous tree is believed to have originated in the eastern Mediterranean Basin. It still provides the hardy and disease-resistant rootstock on which cultivated olive varieties are grafted.

Greek myth and legend
Literate Greeks recalled that the culture hero Aristaeus, originator of the arts of bee-keeping, cheese-making and other innovations of the most distant past, was he who "first pressed the fruit of the oily wild-olive."

In Odyssey Book V, when shipwrecked Odysseus has been cast ashore, he finds a wild-olive that has grown together with a bearing one— inosculated, an arborist would say— on the Scherian seashore, where he crawled
Beneath two bushy olives sprung from the same root
one olive wild, the other well-bred stock
No sodden gusty winds could ever pierce them...
So dense they grew together, tangling side by side.

In the fourth century BCE Theophrastus, the most prominent pupil of Aristotle, wrote an Enquiry into Plants that stands at the head of the literary tradition of botany. Modern botanists often struggle to identify the plants named and described by Theophrastus, and modern naming conventions often make spurious links. An example is the modern genus Cotinus, which, though named after the ancient Greek kotinos, is unrelated to the wild-olive.

Theophrastus noted the kinship of wild-olive with the cultivated olive, but his correspondents informed him that no amount of pruning and transplanting could transform kotinos into olea. Through lack of cultivation, he knew, some cultivated forms of olive, pear or fig might run wild, but in the "rare" case where wild-olive was spontaneously transformed to a fruit-bearing one, it was to be classed among portents. He noted that wild kinds, such as wild pears and the wild-olive tended to bear more fruits than cultivated trees, though of inferior quality, but that if a wild-olive was topped it might bear a larger quantity of its inedible fruits. He noted that the leaf-buds were opposite.

Timber of the wild-olive was valued: it was proof against decay, and was not affected by shipworm, which was a valuable feature in shipbuilding. It also provided stout handles for carpenters' tools.

The ancient wild-olive at Olympia, from which the victors' wreaths were made, had an aition, or origin myth, that was preserved in the local tradition, though the testament to it that has survived in a fragment is a late one, of the poet Phlegon of Tralles, who wrote in the second century CE. It appears that in the first five Olympiads no victor received a wreath, but before the sixth meeting for the games, the Eleans, who were hosts at that time, sent their king Iphitos to Delphi to ask of Apollo whether wreaths might be awarded. The reply came back:
 Iphitos, make not the fruit of an apple the prize of thy contest;
but on the victor's head set a fruitful wreath of wild-olive,
Even the tree now girt with the fine-spun webs of a spider.

On his return to Olympia, Iphitos found that one among the grove of wild-olives in the sacred precinct was wrapped in spider webs called the elaia kallistefanos. "He walled it round," as A.B. Cook says, "and wreathed the victors from its branches."

An ancient wild-olive tree also gained a talismanic character at Megara, according to Theophrastus, who noted how the wood of a tree overgrows and buries within its wood a stone placed in a hole made in its trunk:
This happened with the wild-olive in the market-place at Megara; there was an oracle that, if this were cut open, the city would be taken and plundered, which came to pass when Demetrius took it. For when this tree was split open, there were found greaves and certain other things of Attic workmanship hanging there, the hole in the tree having been made at the place where the things were originally hung on it as offerings. Of this tree a small part still exists.

Heracles' club was wrenched from a wild-olive tree, which the city of Troezen claimed as its own, for in the late second-century CE the traveler Pausanias visited Troezen and recorded an ancient wild-olive with which a local legend was entwined
Here there is also a Hermes called Polygius. Against this image, they say, Heracles leaned his club. Now this club, which was of wild-olive, taking root in the earth (if anyone cares to believe the story), grew up again and is still alive; Heracles, they say, discovering the wild-olive by the Saronic Sea, cut a club from it.

Theocritus makes Heracles tell of his contest with the Nemean Lion:
I held in one hand my darts and the cloak from my shoulders, folded; with the other I swung my seasoned club about my ears and smashed it down on his head, but split the wild-olive, rugged as it was, asunder on the invincible brute's maned skull.

Greek wild olive varieties
Olive tree varieties considered "ancient Greek cultivars".

Almas (Hypoparthenos)
Dryepis (Ryssi)
Ehinos
Favlia (Favlios)
Gergerimos 
Goggylis
Ishas
Kallistefanos
Kolymvas (Niktris oe Vomvia)
Kotonis (Fylia)
Moria
Nitris
Orhas (Orhemon)
Rafanis
Stemfylitis
Trampellos

Old and New Testaments
The Old Testament writers also distinguished the two trees: zayit designates the cultivated olive, the wild-olive being designated in the seventh century BCE Nehemiah 8:15 as eṣ shemen; some modern scholars take this latter term to apply to Elaeagnus angustifolia, the "Russian olive".
 
Paul the Apostle used the practice common in his day of grafting cultivated olive scions to the hardy rootstock of the wild olive in an extended simile in the Epistle to the Romans, contrasting the wild olive tree (Gentiles) and the good "natural" olive tree (Israel): "For if you were cut from what is by nature a wild olive tree, and grafted, contrary to nature, into a cultivated olive tree, how much more will these, the natural branches, be grafted back into their own olive tree." In the Koine Greek of the New Testament, the wild olive has become agrielaios ("of the fields") and the cultivated tree kallielaios ("the fine one").

References

oleaster
Flora of Greece
Matorral shrubland
Trees in religion
Trees in mythology
Drought-tolerant plants